The British Rail Class 22 or "Baby Warship" was a class of diesel-hydraulic locomotives designed for the Western Region of British Railways and built by the North British Locomotive Company. They were very similar in appearance to the Class 21 diesel-electrics. The nickname Baby Warship related to the similarity in appearance (and internal equipment) to the British Rail Class D20/2 or Class 41 Warship Class. The Class 22s were numbered D6300-D6357.

History

Introduction

D6300 was introduced to traffic in 1959 and deliveries continued until 1962. The Class 22s were allocated to Bristol Bath Road, Laira Plymouth, Newton Abbot and Old Oak Common. The majority of the class always operated in the West of England, on a range of local passenger and freight work, with smaller numbers of the later units operating on local work in the Bristol area and around London Paddington (notably moving empty carriages between the main station and Old Oak Common yard).

Availability
Initially the locomotives had some problems with engine and transmission faults, but could be returned to North British Locomotive Works (NBL) for repair under the contractual agreement. By 1961, reliability had improved, but with the more powerful locomotives of Classes 35, 42, and 43 now being available, the locomotives were displaced onto more secondary duties, including work on the former Southern Region lines west of Exeter. By the mid 1960s, the locos had settled down to give reliable service, with availability over 85%.

Decline
NBL went bankrupt in 1962 and, by the late 1960s, withdrawn locomotives were being used to provide spares. Attrition was inevitable and the withdrawals, which had commenced in 1967, finished with the withdrawal of 6333, 6336, 6338 and 6339 on 1 January 1972. Ex-London Midland Region Class 25 diesel-electrics were drafted in as replacements.

Livery 

The NBL type 2s were introduced in all-over green livery with a light grey skirt band, mid-grey roof, red buffer beams and black underframe. Numbers appeared below all four cab windows and the BR 'lion and wheel' emblem was placed high on the bodyside as centrally as possible. Later a small yellow warning was added. From 1967 some locos were repainted in the new corporate rail blue livery. The first four repaints, D6300, D6303, D6314 and D6327 had small yellow warning panels which they retained until withdrawal, later blue repaints had full yellow ends. Only about half the class were repainted into blue. The BR logo was placed immediately below each cab window, with the loco number below this; on some locos this was reversed.

Models 
Dapol released a 00 gauge model of the class 22 in late 2011.

References

Notes

Sources 
 
 
 
 
 
 Ian Allan ABC of British Railways Locomotives, summer 1966 edition

Further reading

External links 

 The Western Region Archive D6300 class introduction  Brief class history, technical details and specifications greatwestern.org.uk

22
B-B locomotives
22
NBL locomotives
Railway locomotives introduced in 1959
Standard gauge locomotives of Great Britain
Scrapped locomotives